The Shephard Prize is awarded by the London Mathematical Society to a mathematician or mathematicians for making a contribution to mathematics with a strong intuitive component which can be explained to those with little or no knowledge of university mathematics, though the work itself may involve more advanced ideas. The prize will be awarded in even-numbered years and is the result of a donation made to the Society by Geoffrey Shephard. The Shephard Prize may not be awarded to any person who has received the De Morgan Medal or the Pólya Prize.

Winners
The winners of the Shephard Prize have been:

 2015 Keith Ball
 2020 Desmond Higham
2020 Kenneth Falconer
 2022 Andrew Lobb

See also

 List of mathematics awards

References

Awards of the London Mathematical Society